Robert Molhoek (born 6 October 1959) is an Australian Liberal National politician who is a member of the Legislative Assembly of Queensland for Southport, having defeated Peter Lawlor at the 2012 state election.

He was appointed Assistant Minister for Child Safety on 3 April 2012, and served in this capacity until 20 February 2013 when he was appointed Assistant Minister for Planning Reform. Following the defeat of the Newman Government at the 2015 state election, Molhoek served as Shadow Minister for Housing and Public Works from 20 February 2015 to 10 May 2016. He also served as Opposition Whip from 15 December 2017 to 15 November 2020. He currently serves as a member of the Health and Environment Committee.

References

1959 births
Living people
Liberal National Party of Queensland politicians
Members of the Queensland Legislative Assembly
Queensland local councillors
People from the Gold Coast, Queensland
21st-century Australian politicians